Sirigere  is a village in the southern state of Karnataka, India. It is located in the Chitradurga District.

 India census, Sirigere had a population of 5768 with 2919 males and 2849 females.

See also
 Davanagere
 Districts of Karnataka

References

External links
 District Portal of, Davangere, India

Villages in Davanagere district